Scherzinger is a German surname. Notable people with the surname include:

 Mara Scherzinger (born 1989), German actress
 Nicole Scherzinger (born 1978), American singer

See also
 Victor Schertzinger (1888–1941), American composer, film director, film producer, and screenwriter

German-language surnames